Bright green environmentalism is an ideology based on the belief that the convergence of technological change and social innovation provides the most successful path to sustainable development.

Origin and evolution of bright green thinking
The term bright green, coined in 2003 by writer Alex Steffen, refers to the fast-growing new wing of environmentalism, distinct from traditional forms. Bright green environmentalism aims to provide prosperity in an ecologically sustainable way through the use of new technologies and improved design.

Proponents promote and advocate for green energy, electric automobiles, efficient manufacturing systems, bio and nanotechnologies, ubiquitous computing, dense urban settlements, closed loop materials cycles and sustainable product designs. One-planet living is a commonly used phrase. Their principal focus is on the idea that through a combination of well-built communities, new technologies and sustainable living practices, quality of life can actually be improved even while ecological footprints shrink.

The term bright green has been used with increased frequency due to the promulgation of these ideas through the Internet and recent coverage in the traditional media.

Dark greens, light greens and bright greens
Alex Steffen describes contemporary environmentalists as being split into three groups, dark, light, and bright greens.

Light Green 
Light greens see protecting the environment first and foremost as a personal responsibility. They fall into the transformational activist end of the spectrum, but light greens do not emphasize environmentalism as a distinct political ideology, or even seek fundamental political reform. Instead they often focus on environmentalism as a lifestyle choice. The motto "Green is the new black" sums up this way of thinking, for many. This is different  from the term lite green, which some environmentalists use to describe products or practices they believe are greenwashing.

Dark Green 
In contrast, dark greens believe that environmental problems are an inherent part of industrialized, capitalist civilization, and seek radical political change. Dark greens believe that currently and historically dominant modes of societal organization inevitably lead to consumerism, overconsumption, waste, alienation from nature and resource depletion. Dark greens claim this is caused by the emphasis on economic growth that exists within all existing ideologies, a tendency sometimes referred to as growth mania. The dark green brand of environmentalism is associated with ideas of ecocentrism, deep ecology, degrowth, anti-consumerism, post-materialism, holism, the Gaia hypothesis of James Lovelock, and sometimes a support for a reduction in human numbers and/or a relinquishment of technology to reduce humanity's effect on the biosphere.

Contrast between Light Green and Dark Green 
Jonathan Bate in The Song of the Earth feels that usually there will be deep divisions in a theory. He feels that one group is “light Greens” also known as “environmentalists” who see protecting the environment first and foremost as a personal responsibility. The other group is “dark Greens” also known as “deep ecologists”. In contrast, they believe that environmental problems are an inherent part of industrialized civilization, and seek radical political changes. This can be simply stated as “Know Technology” vs “No Technology”. (Suresh Frederick in Ecocriticism: Paradigms and Praxis)

Bright Green 
More recently, bright greens emerged as a group of environmentalists who believe that radical changes are needed in the economic and political operation of society in order to make it sustainable, but that better designs, new technologies and more widely distributed social innovations are the means to make those changes—and that society can neither stop nor protest its way to sustainability. As Ross Robertson writes,

International perspective
While bright green environmentalism is an intellectual current among North American environmentalists (with a number of businesses, blogs, NGOs and even governments now explicitly calling themselves bright green—for instance, the City of Vancouver's strategic planning document is called "Vancouver 2020: A Bright Green Future"), it is in Northern Europe, especially Scandinavia, Germany, the Netherlands and the United Kingdom, that the idea of bright green environmentalism has become most widespread and most widely discussed. For instance, the official technology showcase and business expo for the 2009 United Nations Climate Change Conference in Copenhagen was called Bright Green in reference to this idea, while the Danish youth climate activism movement is called Bright Green Youth.

See also 

Biomimicry
Eco-innovation
Ecological modernization
Ecomodernists
Efficient energy use
Environmental technology
Hydrogen economy
Post-scarcity economy
Prometheanism
Renewable energy commercialization
Solarpunk
Technogaianism
Viridian design movement
Whole Earth Discipline, a 2009 book by Stewart Brand

References

External links

The Viridian Design Movement

 
Environmentalism
Green politics
Ecomodernism